Oui is a 2000 album by The Sea and Cake, released on Thrill Jockey.

Critical reception
Trouser Press called the album "lackluster," writing that it "adheres closely to the formula but fails to generate any sort of spark from it." The Chicago Tribune called it the band's "most delicately engrossing work, its charms illustrated in tiny moments of bliss such as the ghostly, Jobim-like fade of 'The Colony Room' or the lush yet fragile orchestrations of 'Seemingly'." SF Weekly deemed it "an unfortunate downtempo detour."

Track listing
 "Afternoon Speaker" – 4:18
 "All the Photos" – 3:19
 "You Beautiful Bastard" – 5:54
 "The Colony Room" – 4:10
 "The Leaf" – 4:24
 "Everyday" – 3:01
 "Two Dolphins" – 3:45
 "Midtown" – 2:56
 "Seemingly" – 4:46
 "I Missed the Glance" – 4:01

References

External links 
Video for "The Colony Room"

The Sea and Cake albums
2000 albums
Thrill Jockey albums